Courtesan (Spanish: Cortesana) is a 1948 Mexican drama film directed by Alberto Gout and starring Crox Alvarado, Meche Barba and Gustavo Rojo.

The film's art direction was by Carlos Toussaint.

Cast
In alphabetical order
 Crox Alvarado 
 Meche Barba 
 Pepe Delgado 
 Leopoldo Francés
 Raúl Guerrero 
 Daniel 'Chino' Herrera 
 Toña la Negra
 David Lama 
 Kika Meyer 
 Chimi Monterrey 
 Pepita Morillo 
 Blanca Estela Pavón
 Humberto Rodríguez 
 Gustavo Rojo 
 Rubén Rojo 
 Arturo Soto Rangel 
 Juan Bruno Tarraza 
 María Luisa Velázquez

References

Bibliography 
 Andrew Grant Wood. Agustin Lara: A Cultural Biography. OUP USA, 2014.

External links 
 

1948 films
1948 drama films
Mexican drama films
1940s Spanish-language films
Films directed by Alberto Gout
Mexican black-and-white films
1940s Mexican films